This article contains a list of all matches played during the 2017 Super Rugby regular season.

Round 1

Round 2

Round 3

Round 4

Round 5

Round 6

Round 7

Round 8

Round 9

Round 10

Round 11

Round 12

Round 13

Round 14

Round 15 (Australia and New Zealand)

Round 16 (New Zealand)

Round 15 (South Africa)

Round 16 (Australia and South Africa)

Round 17

See also

 2017 Super Rugby season

References

2017 Super Rugby season
Super Rugby lists